Lieutenant General Richard Harte Keatinge  (17 June 1825 – 25 May 1904) was an Irish recipient of the Victoria Cross, the highest and most prestigious award for gallantry in the face of the enemy that can be awarded to British and Commonwealth forces.

Life and career 
Keatinge was born in Dublin, younger son of Richard Keatinge and Harriet Augusta Joseph, third daughter of Samuel Joseph. His father was a successful  barrister who served for many years as the Irish Probate judge. His mother came from a prosperous London merchant family. It was a religiously-mixed marriage,  his father being a Protestant  and his mother Jewish.

He was 32 years old, and a major in the Bombay Artillery, Bombay Army during the Indian Mutiny when the following deed took place on 17 March 1858 at the assault of Chundairee for which he was awarded the VC:

In 1862 he was transferred to the Royal Artillery and then to the Bombay Staff Corps of the British Indian Army.

In 1868, Colonel Keatinge designed Rajkumar College, Rajkot, which was formally opened in 1870. The college was founded for the education of the princely order by the princes and chiefs of Kathiawad for their sons and relations.

From 1871 to 1873 he was Chief Commissioner of Ajmer-Merwara.

He became the first Chief Commissioner of Assam in 1874, remaining in this position until 1878. 

He later achieved the rank of lieutenant general.

In retirement, he settled at Horsham, Sussex, where he died in 1904. By his wife Harriet Pottinger, he had eleven children.

Legacy 
A road in the Indian city of Shillong, which was the capital of the British Province of Assam, where Keatinge had served as Chief Commissioner, has been named Keatinge Road in his honour.

References 

Listed in order of publication year 
The Register of the Victoria Cross (1981, 1988 and 1997)

Ireland's VCs  (Dept of Economic Development, 1995)
Monuments to Courage (David Harvey, 1999)
Irish Winners of the Victoria Cross (Richard Doherty & David Truesdale, 2000)

External links 
Location of grave and VC medal (West Sussex)

1825 births
1904 deaths
Burials in Sussex
19th-century Irish people
Irish officers in the British Army
Military personnel from Dublin (city)
Irish recipients of the Victoria Cross
British Indian Army generals
British East India Company Army officers
Indian Rebellion of 1857 recipients of the Victoria Cross
Companions of the Order of the Star of India
Royal Artillery officers
Bombay Artillery officers
Founders of Indian schools and colleges
Indian Staff Corps officers
Bombay Staff Corps officers